Glover Island is a large (178 km2) lake island in the interior of the Island of Newfoundland in the province of Newfoundland and Labrador, Canada. It is the 18th largest lake island in the world by area. The island is located in Grand Lake, a natural lake whose waters were raised for the Deer Lake Power Development. Historic maps show that Glover Island pre-dates this.

The island lies in a general north-east, south-west direction in the Appalachian Mountains of Newfoundland. The island is elongated, measuring 24.2 miles at its longest axis by a medium width of 3.2 miles. The island is known to be rich in minerals and is currently undergoing exploration for precious metals.

Glover Island is dotted by other ponds and lakes. Near the centre of the island is a lake , measuring 1.3 miles by 0.5 miles; its area is 1.41 km2, thus making it one of the largest lakes-on-an-island-in-a-lake-on-an-island (larger than Crater Lake (Philippines) at 1.17 km2). This lake contains seven other islands with the largest of those measuring 112 m by 112 m .

See also 
 Geography of Newfoundland and Labrador
 Recursive islands and lakes

References

Islands of Newfoundland and Labrador
Lake islands of Canada